Madan Singh (born 4 December 1964) is an Indian former long-distance runner who competed up to the marathon distance. He is currently serving in Border Security Force (B.S.F). From the state of Rajasthan, he represented India at 1991 South Asian Games in Colombo and won a bronze medal in the 5000 metres.

In the 31st All India Inter-State Athletics Championship in New Delhi in 1993, he came first in the 10,000 metres run with a time of 29:26:00 to post a new meet record that was only beaten 14 years later by Surendra Singh in 2006.

Singh represented India at the IAAF World Cross Country Championships on three occasions, running in 1992, 1993 and 1994.

International competitions

References

1964 births
Living people
Indian male long-distance runners
Indian male steeplechase runners
Place of birth missing (living people)
South Asian Games silver medalists for India
South Asian Games medalists in athletics